Laguna José Ignacio (José Ignacio Lagoon) is a body of water located between Maldonado Department and Rocha Department, Uruguay.

A sandbank separates it from the Atlantic Ocean. This coastal lagoon was previously served by a small 2-vehicle ferry that required daylight and good weather to operate; in December 2015, the Laguna Garzón Bridge on Route 10 was opened to vehicular traffic, providing a crossing for pedestrians and up to approximately 1,000 vehicles a day.

A birdwatching site, it was designated part of the National System of Protected Areas in Uruguay.

The nearest famous seaside resort is José Ignacio.

References

External links

 Laguna Garzón

Garzon
Landforms of Maldonado Department
Landforms of Rocha Department
Birdwatching sites in Uruguay
Lagoons of South America
Protected areas of Uruguay